Thomas Pride VC (29 March 1835 – 16 July 1893) was an English recipient of the Victoria Cross, the highest and most prestigious award for gallantry in the face of the enemy that can be awarded to a serviceman in the British and Commonwealth forces.

Details
Pride was 29 years old, and a captain of the after guard in the Royal Navy during the Shimonoseki Expedition, Japan when the following deed took place for which he was awarded the VC.

On 6 September 1864 at Shimonoseki, Japan, Captain of the After Guard Pride was one of the two colour sergeants who accompanied Midshipman Duncan Gordon Boyes from HMS Euryalus when they carried the Queen's Colour into action in the capture of the enemy's stockade. They kept the flag flying in spite of the fierce fire which killed the other colour sergeant and severely wounded Pride. He and the midshipman, however, did not falter and were only finally prevented from going further forward by direct orders from their superior officer.

Medal
His Victoria Cross is displayed at the National Maritime Museum at Greenwich, London.

References

1835 births
1893 deaths
People from Wareham, Dorset
Royal Navy sailors
British recipients of the Victoria Cross
Royal Navy recipients of the Victoria Cross
Royal Navy personnel of the Second Opium War
British military personnel of the Shimonoseki campaign